

The Avibras A-80 Falcão was a training aircraft from the Brazilian manufacturer Avibras.

Design and development
The A-80 Falcão was developed as a beginner trainer aircraft for the Brazilian Air Force, but the latter opted for the Aerotec A-122 Uirapuru, so only one prototype was built.

The aircraft was designed as a low-wing monoplane with a conventional tailplane and had a non-retractable nose wheel landing gear. The aircraft was of wooden frame construction covered with synthetic fabric. The instructor and student pilots sat in an enclosed cockpit, the canopy of which could be slid rearward for entry.

Specifications

See also
Avibras Falcão

References
Notes

Bibliography

Single-engined tractor aircraft
Low-wing aircraft
Aircraft first flown in 1963
1960s Brazilian experimental aircraft